Acanthocarpus canaliculatus is a rhizomatous perennial that fringes creeks, swamps and salt lakes and on stony sites in Western Australia. White flowers appear between June and October in the species' native range.

Distribution
A. canaliculatus is found in Beard's Eremaean Province and South-West Provinces; and in the more recent biogeographical regions of IBRA: Avon Wheatbelt, Geraldton Sandplains, Jarrah Forest, Swan Coastal Plain, and  Yalgoo.

References

External links
 Australasian Virtual Herbarium: Acanthocarpus canaliculatus occurrence records

canaliculatus
Asparagales of Australia
Angiosperms of Western Australia
Taxa named by Alex George